Robert Wierinckx (12 April 1915, Ixelles — 29 December 2002, Rixensart) was a Belgian professional road bicycle racer. In 1936, he was the winner of the second stage in the Tour de France.

Major results

1934
Brussels-Luxembourg-Mondorf
Tour of Belgium for independents
Tour de l'Ouest
Charleroi
1936
Namur
Tour de France:
Winner stage 2
1937
Circuit du Morbihan
1939
Brussels-Ans

External links 

Official Tour de France results for Robert Wierinckx

1915 births
2002 deaths
People from Ixelles
Belgian male cyclists
Belgian Tour de France stage winners
Cyclists from Brussels